Saint Gobain (died 670), also known as Goban, was an Irish monk and spiritual student of Saint Fursey at Burgh Castle, Norfolk, England.

Born in Ireland, he was a brother of Saint Wasnon, (to whom a church is dedicated in Condé-sur-l'Escaut). Gobain accompanied Fursey to France. Some accounts have him staying at the Abbey of Saint Vincent in Picardy, or the abbey of Corbény in Champagne, before settling in a hermitage in the forest of Voas, near the present Saint-Gobain. There he brought forth a spring by thrusting his pilgrim's staff into the ground.

In 670, Gobain was beheaded by marauders, and buried in his oratory, which became a place of pilgrimage. His feast day is observed on 20 June.

References

External links
 

7th-century births
670 deaths
7th-century Frankish saints
East Anglian saints
Medieval Irish saints
Colombanian saints
7th-century Irish people
Irish expatriates in England
Irish Benedictines